"A World of Our Own" is a 1965 single written by Tom Springfield and was an international hit for the Seekers. The single peaked at number 19 on the Hot 100 and number 2 on the Easy Listening charts. It reached number 3 in the U.K. and number 2 in Australia.

Three years later, "A World of Our Own" was recorded by Sonny James. It was his sixth number one in a row, and 26th hit on the U.S. country music chart. The single spent three weeks at number one and a total of 15 weeks on the chart.

In 1994 the single was re-released in the UK. The four track CD contained the original recording, a new recording of the song, and two B-sides - When the Stars begin to fall (originally the B-side of Morningtown Ride and the newly-recorded Keep a dream in your pocket.

Chart performance

The Seekers

Sonny James

Hong Kong Christian version
The song was translated into Cantonese and became a popular Christian song in Hong Kong as "Can't forget God's love" (主爱永难忘).

References

1968 singles
Sonny James songs
Number-one singles in South Africa
Songs written by Tom Springfield
Capitol Records singles
1965 songs
The Seekers songs